Alfred Philip Binns (24 July 1929 – 29 December 2017) was a West Indian cricketer from Jamaica who played in five Tests between 1953 and 1956. He played as wicketkeeper in all five Tests.

Career 
Binns attended St. George's College and represented Jamaica in first-class cricket from 1950 to 1957. His highest score was 157 against British Guiana in 1952–53. He also scored 151 for Jamaica against the Australians in 1954–55, when he and Collie Smith added 277 for the sixth wicket in 230 minutes after Jamaica had been 81 for 5. He toured New Zealand in 1955-56, playing in three of the four Tests.

After Binns finished playing cricket he migrated to the United States, where he graduated from Northeastern University in Boston and worked as a teacher in Massachusetts. He married Henrietta Elizabeth Harrison in Boston in 1959, and they had two daughters. They retired to Florida in 1985. Binns died in Florida in December 2017 at the age of 88.

References

External links
 
 Alfred Binns at CricketArchive

1929 births
2017 deaths
Sportspeople from Kingston, Jamaica
West Indies Test cricketers
Jamaican cricketers
Jamaica cricketers
Northeastern University alumni